Sarah Harris (born 13 July 1981) is an Australian television presenter and journalist. In 2023 she is co-hosting Network 10's The Project.

Early life
Harris grew up in a block of housing commission flats in Mount Druitt, a western suburb of Sydney. She has one younger brother. Her father died of prostate cancer at 50. She is of Croatian descent through her grandparents, who emigrated to Australia.

Career
Harris studied journalism and international business at Queensland University of Technology. Her journalism career started in 1997 at the Seven Network in Brisbane, where she filed reports for Seven News and later Today Tonight.

In June 2001, she joined Prime Gold Coast News where she was a freelance television reporter and presenter. She then moved back to the Seven Network in Brisbane where she was a cadet news reporter and writer.

In 2002, Harris joined the Nine Network and became a reporter, researcher, and fill-in presenter on Extra. She also joined National Nine News as a reporter and Today. She delivered live reports from the scene of the Cairns Tilt Train derailment in November 2004, as well as Sir Joh Bjelke-Petersen’s funeral in Kingaroy in 2005. She left Today in 2005 to become a reporter and fill-in presenter on National Nine News in Brisbane.

In 2007, Harris moved to Sydney to become a Today reporter and a fill-in news presenter. She was also a fill-in news presenter on Nine Morning News, Nine Afternoon News, Nine News Sydney and Weekend Today.

In 2012, Harris was the main fill-in presenter for Sonia Kruger on Mornings. She also filled in for Leila McKinnon on Weekend Today whilst she was on maternity leave.

In August 2013, she resigned from the Nine Network to join Network Ten's then new morning program, Studio 10 as a co-host with Ita Buttrose, Joe Hildebrand and Jessica Rowe.
She has also been a fill-in host on Network Ten program The Project.

In November 2014, Harris was announced as the host of Shark Tank.

In February 2016, Harris was welcomed to the No Agenda round table as a Black Dame by Adam Curry and John C Dvorak.

On 31 October 2016, Harris gained a Guinness World Record for Most Pumpkins Smashed in One Minute while dressed as Wednesday Addams from The Addams Family.

On 23 November 2022, Sarah announced that she would be leaving Studio 10 after hosting the show for nine years to become the new host of The Project in 2023.

Personal life
Harris married Information Technology specialist Tom Ward in Sydney in 2014. Harris and Ward have two children. In March 2021, Harris announced that she and Ward are "taking time apart however we remain good friends and deeply committed to co-parenting our two beautiful boys".

Harris is a former pack-a-day smoker, having quit in 2014. However, she was seen smoking with co-host Joe Hildebrand at the Logie Awards 2016. She claimed at that moment it was the first cigarette she had had since her pregnancy. Harris has since resumed smoking full time.

In October 2017, Harris and Ward bought a $2.175 million home in Sydney's North Shore.

References

External links
 Sarah Harris at Studio 10

Australian television journalists
Living people
Australian people of Croatian descent
1981 births
20th-century Australian journalists
21st-century Australian journalists
Australian women television journalists
Australian television presenters
Australian women television presenters
Journalists from Sydney
20th-century Australian women